Vasundhara Devi (1917-1988) was an Indian actress, trained Bharathanatyam dancer and carnatic singer. The Indian actress Vyjayanthimala is her daughter.

Filmography
(1941) Rishyasringar
(1943) Mangamma Sapatham
(1947) Udayanan Vasavadatta
(1949) Naattiya Rani
(1959) Paigham
(1960) Irumbu Thirai

References

External links

Indian film actresses
Actresses in Hindi cinema
Actresses in Tamil cinema
Women Carnatic singers
Carnatic singers
Singers from Chennai
Bharatanatyam exponents
Indian female classical dancers
Performers of Indian classical dance
20th-century Indian singers
20th-century Indian actresses
20th-century Indian dancers
20th-century Indian women artists
Women artists from Tamil Nadu
20th-century Indian women singers
1917 births
1988 deaths